The North British Society (also known as "The Scots" and "Scots Club") was founded in Halifax, Nova Scotia in 1768, the oldest Scottish heritage society outside Great Britain. North British is an adjective used as an alternative to "Scottish".

History 
The Society was established "for the benefit of ourselves and assistance of each other, who may be afflicted with disease or any other casualty or misfortune."  Since 1768, the Society has continued to support the Scottish community in Nova Scotia.

The Society met regularly at the Great Pontack (Halifax).

The Society likely commissioned the portrait of Prince Edward by William J. Weaver which now is in Province House (Nova Scotia) (1797).  The Society  raffled the portrait on the eve of the North British Society's local celebration of the St. Andrew's Day, when the patriotic sentiment was roused by the stunning news of Admiral Nelson's glorious naval victory over Napoleon in the Battle of the Nile.

The Society public activities include commissioning three works for Victoria Park, Halifax: the Robert Burns statue (1919), the Sir Walter Scott bust (1932), and the Sir William Alexander cairn (1957).

Work commissioned

Notable members

Political figure 
 William Annand
 Sir William Young (Nova Scotia politician)
George Henry Murray, longest serving Premier of Nova Scotia
Charles James MacDonald

Doctor 
John Halliburton (surgeon)
Duncan Clark (surgeon)

Legal Profession 
 Judge Brenton Halliburton
 Robert Sedgewick (judge)
 Chief Justice Thomas Andrew Lumisden Strange

Merchant 
 John Black (New Brunswick merchant)
 Alexander Keith (Canadian politician) and brewer
James Fraser (businessman)
John Esson
Alexander Brymer
William Bowie (merchant)
William Murdoch (merchant)

Military officer 
James J. Bremner
Andrew MacDonald (military officer), Rogart
 Henry Duncan (Royal Navy officer, born 1735)
Patrick Leonard MacDougall

Other 
Archibald Gray
Sandford Fleming
Alexander Forrester (educationist)
 Sir Charles Frederick Fraser
 George Lang (builder)
Andrew Brown (minister)
Thomas Douglas, 5th Earl of Selkirk (1804)
John Campbell, 9th Duke of Argyll

See also 
Charitable Irish Society of Halifax

References 
 The Scots (North British Society)
 Annals, North British Society, Halifax, Nova Scotia : with portraits and biographical notes, 1768-1903 (1905)
"Discourse delivered before the North-British Society: in Halifax, Nova Scotia, at their anniversary meeting on the 30th of November 1790 (1791)" by Andrew Brown
"Annals of the North British Society of Halifax, Nova Scotia: from its foundation in 1768, to its centenary celebration March 26th, 1865 (1868)"
 "Celebration of Burns' centenary: Halifax, Nova Scotia, 25th Januaay [sic] 1859 (1859)"
Endnotes

Culture of Halifax, Nova Scotia
1768 establishments in Nova Scotia
Organizations established in 1768
Scottish Canadian